The spouse or partner of the prime minister of New Zealand is the wife, husband or domestic partner of the New Zealand prime minister. She or he is the hostess or host of Premier House. It is not an official office and, as such, they are not given a salary or official duties.

The current prime minister, Chris Hipkins, is married, but has been separated from his wife, Jade Marie Hipkins, since 2022.

When Henry Sewell became the country's first premier in 1856, his wife, Elizabeth Kittoe, became the first spouse to fill the role. The first husband to the prime minister was Burton Shipley, Jenny Shipley's husband, in 1997. The 23rd prime minister, Michael Joseph Savage, was a bachelor during his term, and prime minister Jacinda Ardern was never married to her partner Clarke Gayford during her tenure from 2017 to 2023.

Current
The current spouse of the Prime Minister of New Zealand is Jade Marie Hipkins, as her husband became prime minister on 25 January 2023. The couple married in 2020, but have been separated since 2022, and do not live together.

Role
The prime minister's spouse has no official duties. Some earlier spouses stayed mainly at home and took little part in public life.

However, most recent prime ministers' spouses have been involved in charities or community organisations, working to raise public awareness, funds, and support for a range of causes. They generally assist their partners in political campaigns, and participate in official duties that come with the position, such as hosting foreign dignitaries, and, in particular, entertaining the spouses of dignitaries; accompanying the prime minister on national and international trips; and attending conferences and functions. They have attended the opening of Parliament; hosted visitors at Premier House; visited Buckingham Palace, the White House, or the Japanese Imperial Palace; and been present at royal coronations and conferences.

Official recognition
Some prime ministers' spouses have received official recognition for their services to the community with a damehood:
 Dame Christina Massey, 
 Dame Norma Holyoake, 
 Dame Ruth Kirk, 
 Dame Thea Muldoon, 

Muldoon was the first spouse of a prime minister to be provided with an official secretary for dealing with her correspondence.

List of spouses

 Domestic partner; engaged since May 2019.

* Incumbent's length of tenure last updated: .

See also
 First Lady
 Spouse of the governor-general of New Zealand

References

 
Prime Ministers of New Zealand
Spouses of the Prime Minister
New Zealand